The 2006–07 CHL season was the 15th season of the Central Hockey League (CHL).

Regular season

Division standings

Note: GP = Games played; W = Wins; L = Losses; SOL = Shootout loss;  Pts = Points; GF = Goals for; GA = Goals against

y - clinched league title; x - clinched playoff spot; e - eliminated from playoff contention

Playoffs

Format
The top six teams in each conference qualified for the playoffs.  All series were best-of-seven.  The highest seeded first round losing team advanced to the second round as a wild card team.

Playoff bracket

Awards
Source:Central Hockey League Historical Award Winners
Ray Miron President’s Cup (Playoff Champions) - Colorado Eagles 
Governors’ Cup (regular-season champions) - Bossier-Shreveport Mudbugs 
Most Valuable Player - Jeff Christian, Youngstown 
Most Outstanding Goaltender - John DeCaro, Bossier-Shreveport 
Most Outstanding Defenseman - Brad Williamson, Colorado 
Rookie of the Year - Cam Abbott, Bossier-Shreveport 
Coach of the Year - Kevin McClelland, Memphis 
Man of the Year - Riley Nelson, Colorado 
Rick Kozuback Award - Marco Pietroniro, Arizona 
Joe Burton Award (Scoring Champion) - Jeff Christian, Youngstown 
Playoff Most Valuable Player - Greg Pankewicz, Colorado 
All-Star Game Most Valuable Player (North) - Matt Medley, Tulsa 
All-Star Game Most Valuable Player (South) - Brent Zelenewich, Corpus Christi 
Athletic Trainer of the Year – Mike Ermatinger, Youngstown 
Equipment Manager of the Year– Brandon Rose, Oklahoma City

All-CHL Team
Forward: Jeff Christian, Youngstown 
Forward: Brent Kelly, Arizona 
Forward: Chris Richards, Youngstown 
Defenseman: Derek Landmesser, Memphis 
Defenseman: Brad Williamson, Colorado 
Goaltender : John DeCaro, Bossier-Shreveport

All-Rookie Team
Forward - Cam Abbott, Bossier-Shreveport 
Forward - Bobby Chaumont, Laredo 
Forward - Ryan McLeod, New Mexico 
Defenseman - Alex Dunn, Odessa 
Defenseman - Craig Strain, Colorado 
Goaltender - John DeCaro, Bossier-Shreveport

References

Central Hockey League seasons
2006–07 in American ice hockey by league